Algueirão – Mem Martins is a Portuguese civil parish, in the municipality (concelho) of Sintra. 

It was elevated from the status of village to town on 1 February 1988.

History

Toponymy
The toponym 'Algueirão' dates back to the Muslim presence in the region between the 8th and 12th centuries. It evolved from the Arab term al-gueirān, meaning the caves.

'Mem Martins' is a proper name of uncertain origin, consisting of the medieval given name Mem and the patronymic Martins, likely after one of the first property owners in the region following the Portuguese conquest of Lisbon and Sintra.

Geography 
It covers 16.00 km².

Demographics 
The population in 2011 was 66,250. The population density is about 4000 inhabitants per square kilometer.

Notable structures
 Fountain of Sacotes
 Church of Nossa Senhora das Mercês, a 17th-century church and churchyard;
 Hermitage of São Romão, a Manueline-era rural hermitage, comprising one nave with a vaulted ceiling.

Notable people
 André Ventura, jurist, professor, former sports pundit and politician, founder and president of the Chega party

References

Parishes of Sintra